Apatura is a genus of butterflies commonly known as the emperors.

Species
Listed alphabetically:
 Apatura ilia ([Denis and Schiffermüller], 1775) – lesser purple emperor
 Apatura iris  (Linnaeus, 1758) – purple emperor
 Apatura laverna Leech, 1893
 Apatura metis Freyer, 1829 – Freyer's purple emperor

Moved to genus Chitoria:
 Apatura fasciola (Leech, 1890) now in Chitoria fasciola
 Apatura sordida (Moore, 1865) – sordid emperor now in Chitoria sordida
 Apatura ulupi (Doherty, 1889) – tawny emperor now in Chitoria ulupi
 Apatura vietnamica Nguyen, 1979 now in Chitoria vietnamica

Moved to genus Mimathyma:
 Apatura ambica (Kollar, 1844) – Indian purple emperor now in Mimathyma ambica
 Apatura chevana Moore 1865 – sergeant emperor now in Mimathyma chevana
 Apatura nycteis Ménétriès, 1859 now in Mimathyma nycteis
 Apatura schrenckii Ménétriès, 1858 – Schrenck's emperor now in Mimathyma schrenckii

References

Further reading
 1950. Le Moult (E.), Révision de la classification des Apaturinae de l'Ancien Monde, supplement to Miscellanea Entomologica.
 1971. Rigout (J.), Une ponte dApatura en captivité, Alexanor.
 1976. Nguyen (T. H.), Les Apatura. Polymorphisme et spéciation (Nymphalidae). Sciences Nat.

External links
Images representing Apatura at  Consortium for the Barcode of Life

Apaturinae
Taxa named by Johan Christian Fabricius
Nymphalidae genera